Sarajevo Pride, or Bosnian-Herzegovinian Pride, is the LGBT pride parade in the city of Sarajevo, the capital of Bosnia and Herzegovina, which first took place in 2019.

History 

The country's first pride parade was held on 9 September 2019 in Sarajevo. An estimated 2,000 people marched in the first pride parade of Bosnia and Herzegovina, making the country the last former Yugoslav nation to hold a pride event.

A second pride parade was supposed to take place on 23 August 2020, starting at 12:00h in Sarajevo, but it was canceled due to the COVID-19 pandemic. The second pride parade in Sarajevo therefore took place on 14 August 2021.

Religious groups in Bosnia and Herzegovina condemned the Sarajevo Pride and Muslim Bosnian political and religious groups organized rallies against the Pride.

The third pride parade in Sarajevo was held on June 25, 2022 under the slogan "Family Gathering", with which the organizers pointed out the importance of family support for queer people. About 1,000 citizens joined the procession, and the event itself was accompanied by strong security measures. In addition to the organizers, the Prime Minister of the Sarajevo Canton, Edin Forto, also sent a message from the meeting, saying that this is a protest of citizens for greater rights, referring to political and homophobic comments on social networks.

List of parades

See also
LGBT rights in Bosnia and Herzegovina

References

External links
Official website

Pride parades in Bosnia and Herzegovina
Recurring events established in 2019
Culture in Sarajevo
Annual events in Bosnia and Herzegovina